Logger's Leap was a log flume ride at Thorpe Park, UK. It was the tallest log flume in the UK. The ride closed in 2015.

History
Logger's Leap opened in 1989 on the lake at the back of the park, along with a new themed area 'Canada Creek'. It was manufactured by Mack Rides. The attraction featured a 'country and Western' pop soundtrack including 5,6,7,8 by Steps, Cotton-Eyed Joe by Rednex, Southern Nights by Glen Campbell and 9 to 5 by Dolly Parton.

The ride was the tallest log flume ride in the UK upon opening, although this was surpassed by "Nightmare Niagara" at American Adventure theme park near Derby. Following the closure of American Adventure, Logger's Leap regained its record.

The ride famously featured in press photographs of the Royal family with Princess Diana in 1993. A dedication plaque was erected next to the attraction following her death.

In 2013, the tunnel enclosing the first lift and drop was removed due to poor structural maintenance over time.

Logger's Leap did not open after the 2015 season and stood not operating. The park announced via social media that the ride was "under redevelopment". In February 2019, it was confirmed that Logger's Leap had permanently closed and ride parts were to be auctioned in May, however no auction ever took place.

During Fright Nights 2019, the old station was used as the venue for a new scare maze, "Creek Freak Massacre".

Ride experience

Riders queued up in one of five queues at the front of the station. Each Logger's Leap boat held up to five people - two in the front and three in the back.

Once the boat left the station it meandered towards a tunnel. The boat was then lifted up into the tunnel before descending the first drop in complete darkness. The boat exited the tunnel amongst woodland at the back of the park, where it crossed the main lake and made its way to the second lift hill. This hill, the biggest of the ride, featured a steep drop with a double dip. The boat descended the drop into a splashdown, then meandered back to the station across the edge of the lake.

Post-closure redevelopments 
Thorpe Park initially claimed via social media that they were "hoping for it to make a splashback soon". Since the official closure, however, Thorpe Park stated on their website in 2019 that "situations can change and as plans develop they often move in different directions". They followed by stating that "the area that Logger's Leap once dominated will be forming part of our long term development plans."

On 14 March 2022, Thorpe Park submitted an extensive planning application to Runnymede Borough Council detailing their proposed redevelopments of the Old Town area of the park. The main focus of the application is their proposed new roller coaster code-named 'Project Exodus'. Assuming permission is granted by the council, the plans would see Logger's Leap demolished to make way for the new attraction.

References

External links 

 Loggers Leap at Total Thorpe Park
 Loggers Leap at Theme Park Junkies
 Loggers Leap at ThemeParks-UK

Thorpe Park water rides
Abandoned buildings and structures
Amusement rides introduced in 1989
1989 establishments in the United Kingdom
2015 disestablishments in the United Kingdom